The AGM-88 HARM (High-speed Anti-Radiation Missile) is a tactical, air-to-surface anti-radiation missile designed to home in on electronic transmissions coming from surface-to-air radar systems. It was originally developed by Texas Instruments as a replacement for the AGM-45 Shrike and AGM-78 Standard ARM system. Production was later taken over by Raytheon Corporation when it purchased the defense production business of Texas Instruments.

Description
The AGM-88 can detect, attack and destroy a radar antenna or transmitter with minimal aircrew input. The proportional guidance system that homes in on enemy radar emissions has a fixed antenna and seeker head in the missile's nose. A smokeless, solid-propellant, booster-sustainer rocket motor propels the missile at speeds over Mach 2.0. The HARM was a missile program led by the U.S. Navy, and it was first carried by the A-6E, A-7, and F/A-18A/B aircraft, and then it equipped the EA-6B and EA-18G dedicated electronic attack aircraft. RDT&E for use on the F-14 aircraft was begun, but not completed. The U.S. Air Force (USAF) put the HARM onto the F-4G Wild Weasel aircraft, and later on specialized F-16s equipped with the HARM Targeting System (HTS). The missile has three operational modes: Pre-Briefed (PB), Target Of Opportunity (TOO) and Self-Protect (SP). The HTS pod, used by the USAF only, allows F-16s to detect and automatically target radar systems with HARMs instead of relying on the missile's sensors alone.

History

Deployment

United States
The HARM missile was approved for full production in March 1983, obtained initial operating capability (IOC) on the A-7E Corsair II in late 1983 and then deployed in late 1985 with VA-46 aboard the aircraft carrier USS America. In 1986, the first successful firing of the HARM from an EA-6B was performed by VAQ-131. It was soon used in combat—in March 1986 against a Libyan S-200 surface to air missiles site in the Gulf of Sidra, and then during Operation Eldorado Canyon in April.

HARM was used extensively by the Navy, Marine Corps, and the Air Force in Operation Desert Storm during the Persian Gulf War of 1991.
During the Gulf War, the HARM was involved in a friendly fire incident when the pilot of an F-4G Wild Weasel escorting a B-52G bomber mistook the latter's tail gun radar for an Iraqi AAA site — this was after the tail gunner of the B-52 had targeted the F-4G, mistaking it for an Iraqi MiG. The F-4 pilot launched the missile and then saw that the target was the B-52, which was hit. It survived with shrapnel damage to the tail and no casualties. The B-52 (serial number 58-0248) was subsequently renamed In HARM's Way.

"Magnum" is spoken over the radio to announce the launch of an AGM-88. During the Gulf War, if an aircraft was illuminated by enemy radar a bogus "Magnum" call on the radio was often enough to convince the operators to power down. This technique would also be employed in Yugoslavia during air operations in 1999. On 28 April 1999, during this campaign, an early variant of the AGM-88, after being fired in self defense mode by a NATO jet, lost its radio frequency track as the Serbian air defense radar was turned off, hitting a house in the Gorna Banya district of the Bulgarian capital, Sofia, causing damages, but no casualties.

During the 1990s and early 2000s and during the initial weeks of the operation Iraqi Freedom, the HARM was used to enforce the Iraqi No-Fly-Zones, degrading the Iraqi air defenses trying to engage US and allied patrolling aircraft.
During the opening days of Operation Iraqi Freedom, deconflicting US Army Patriot batteries and allied aircraft routes turned out being more difficult than expected, resulting in three major friendly fire incidents: in one of them, on March 24, 2003, a USAF F-16CJ Fighting Falcon fired an AGM-88 HARM at a Patriot missile battery after the Patriot's radar had locked onto and prepared to fire at the aircraft, causing the pilot to mistake it for an Iraqi surface-to-air missile system because the aircraft was in air combat operations and was on its way to a mission near Baghdad. The HARM damaged the Patriot's radar system with no casualties.

Starting in March 2011, during Operation Unified Protector against Libya, US Navy EA-18Gs had their combat debut using HARMs against Libyan air defenses together with USAF F-16CJs and Italian Tornadoes.

Israel
In 2013, US President Obama offered the AGM-88 to Israel for the first time.

Italy
Starting in March 2011, during Operation Unified Protector, Italian Tornadoes employed AGM-88 HARMs against Libyan air defenses.

Ukraine
In mid-2022, during the Russian invasion of Ukraine, the US supplied AGM-88 HARM missiles to Ukraine. It was only disclosed after Russian forces showed footage of a tail fin from one of these missiles in early August 2022. U.S. Under Secretary of Defense for Policy Colin Kahl said in recent aid packages they had included a number of anti-radiation missiles that can be fired by Ukrainian aircraft. As built, Soviet-era aircraft do not have the computer architecture to accept NATO standard weapons. Indeed, none of the former Warsaw Pact countries, even those that have had their Soviet-era aircraft updated, were enabled to fire a HARM before. The interface seemed difficult unless using a "crude modification", such as integrating it with an added e-tablet into the cockpit, building a nearly totally independent subsystem within the carrying aircraft. As suggested by Domenic Nicholis, defense correspondent for the Telegraph in the UK, the HARM missile is possibly operating in one of its three modes that enables it to find its target once flying after being released towards a possible enemy air defense and electronic emission area. Pre mission or during flight, NATO signals intelligence aircraft or different intelligence would be providing the overall electromagnetic emissions battlefield to locate the Russian radars where the Ukrainian jets, armed with HARMs would be directed to fire them. This allows the missile to achieve a very long range attack profile, even if it's possible that the missile does not find a target while flying, going wasted. A second possible use of the HARM is operating it in a mode called “HARM as sensor”. Similar to the described mode before, the missile acts as both sensor and weapon, not requiring a sensor pod. A simple interface would show that the missile has a target and the pilot can launch it. In this way the range is shorter, and the jet could be under threat already, but would maximize the possibility to hit the emitter.

In August 2022, a senior U.S. defense official confirmed that the Ukrainians have successfully integrated the AGM-88 HARM missile onto their "MiG aircraft", hinting the MiG-29 was the chosen fighter jet with video evidence of AGM-88 missiles fired by upgraded Ukrainian MiG-29s released by the Ukrainian Air Force a few days later.

Speaking on 19 September, US Air Force General James B. Hecker said the effort to integrate AGM-88 HARM missiles into the Ukrainian Su-27s and MiG-29s took "some months" to achieve. This does not give the Ukrainian air force the same "capabilities that it would on an F-16.” However he said: “Even though you don’t get a kinetic kill … you can get local air superiority for a period of time where you can do what you need to do.”

During early September 2022, a Ukrainian Su-27S was spotted with an AGM-88 HARM fitted on the wing pylons. This is the first case of an Su-27 being spotted with an AGM-88 fitted. The missile has been directly fitted to the APU-470 missile launchers, the same launcher used by MiG-29 and Su-27 to fire missiles like the R-27 (air-to-air missile). This suggests that mounting the missile on Soviet aircraft is much easier than experts initially believed. Being as simple as  "requiring just an interface for the different wirings and the hanging points of the missile". The earlier footage of a Ukrainian MiG-29 using an AGM-88 indicated that the display recognized the missile as a R-27EP, which is designed to lock onto airborne radars. This suggests that the aircraft are using their own avionics to fire the missile, without the need for additional modifications.

In December, Ukrainian Air Force released a video showing a MiG-29  firing two HARM missiles in a volley.  Russia has made the first claim of the war that they have shot down four HARM missiles.

Variants

AGM-88E AARGM

A newer upgrade, the AGM-88E Advanced Antiradiation Guided Missile (AARGM), features the latest software, enhanced capabilities intended to counter enemy radar shutdown, and passive radar using an additional active millimeter-wave seeker. It was released in November 2010, and it is a joint venture by the US Department of Defense and the Italian Ministry of Defense, produced by Orbital ATK.

In November 2005, the Italian Ministry of Defense and the U.S. Department of Defense signed a Memorandum of Agreement on the joint development of the AGM-88E AARGM missile. Italy was providing $20 million of developmental funding as well as several million dollars worth of material, equipment, and related services. The Italian Air Force was expected to buy up to 250 missiles for its Tornado ECR aircraft. A flight test program was set to integrate the AARGM onto Tornado ECR's weapon system.

The U.S. Navy demonstrated the AARGM's capability during Initial Operational Test and Evaluation (IOT&E) in spring 2012 with live firing of 12 missiles. Aircrew and maintenance training with live missiles was completed in June.

The Navy authorized Full-Rate Production (FRP) of the AARGM in August 2012, with 72 missiles for the Navy and nine for the Italian Air Force to be delivered in 2013. A U.S. Marine Corps F/A-18 Hornet squadron will be the first forward-deployed unit with the AGM-88E.

In September 2013, ATK delivered the 100th AARGM to the U.S. Navy. The AGM-88E program is on schedule and on budget, with Full Operational Capability (FOC) planned for September 2014. The AGM-88E was designed to improve the effectiveness of legacy HARM variants against fixed and relocatable radar and communications sites, particularly those that would shut down to throw off anti-radiation missiles, by attaching a new seeker to the existing Mach 2-capable rocket motor and warhead section, adding a passive anti-radiation homing receiver, satellite and inertial navigation system, a millimeter-wave radar for terminal guidance, and the ability to beam up images of the target via a satellite link just seconds before impact.

This model of the HARM will be integrated onto the F/A-18C/D/E/F, EA-18G, Tornado ECR aircraft, and later on the F-35 (externally).

In September 2015, the AGM-88E successfully hit a mobile ship target in a live-fire test, demonstrating the missile's ability to use antiradiation homing and millimeter-wave radar to detect, identify, locate, and engage moving targets.

In December 2019, the German Air Force ordered the AARGM. On August 4, 2020, Northrop Grumman's Alliant Techsystems Operations division, based in Northridge, California, was awarded a $12,190,753 IDIQ contract for AARGM depot sustainment support, guidance section and control section repair, and equipment box test and inspection. On August 31, 2020, the same Northrop Grumman division was allocated roughly $80.9 million to develop new technology for the AARGM.

AGM-88F HCSM
Although the US Navy/Marine Corps chose the Orbital ATK-produced AGM-88E AARGM, Raytheon developed its own update of the HARM called the AGM-88F HARM Control Section Modification (HCSM), tested in conjunction with and ultimately for the US Air Force. It incorporates similar upgrade features as the AARGM, and although it is not yet listed for export, existing HARM users have shown interest.

AGM-88G AARGM-ER 
The Navy's FY 2016 budget included funding for an extended range AARGM-ER that uses the existing guidance system and warhead of the AGM-88E with a solid integrated rocket-ramjet to double the range. In September 2016, Orbital ATK unveiled its extended-range AARGM-ER, which incorporates a redesigned control section and  rocket motor for twice the range and internal carriage on the Lockheed Martin F-35A and F-35C Lightning II; internal carriage on the F-35B is not possible due to internal space limitations. The new missile utilizes the AARGM's warhead and guidance systems in a new airframe that replaces the mid-body wings with aerodynamic strakes along the sides with control surfaces relocated to low-drag tail surfaces and a more powerful propulsion system for greater speed and range. It reportedly doubles the range and speed of the AGM-88E which would result in the AGM-88G's range being around 300 km and speed of Mach 4 respectively. 

The U.S. Navy awarded Orbital ATK a contract for AARGM-ER development in January 2018. The USAF later joined the AARGM-ER program, involved in internal F-35A/C integration work. The AARGM-ER received Milestone-C approval in August 2021, and the first low-rate initial production contract was awarded the next month; initial operational capability is planned for 2023. The AARGM-ER completed its first, second, third and fourth flight tests at the Point Mugu Sea Range in July 2021, January 2022, July 2022, and December 2022 respectively.

In February 2023, the U.S. Navy began exploring the feasibility of launching the AARGM-ER from ground-based launchers and the P-8 Poseidon.

On February 27, 2023, Australia has requested to purchase up to 63 AGM-88G AARGM-ERs.

Stand-in Attack Weapon
In May 2022, the USAF awarded contracts to L3Harris Technologies, Lockheed Martin, and Northrop Grumman to begin the first phase of development for the Stand-in Attack Weapon (SiAW), which will be the successor to the AARGM-ER. While previous HARMs were meant to attack air defense radars, the SiAW will have a broader target set including ballistic missile launchers, cruise and anti-ship missile launchers, GPS jamming platforms, and anti-satellite systems. It will have a shorter range than standoff weapons, being fired by an aircraft after penetrating enemy airspace. The SiAW will fit inside the F-35's internal weapon bays. The Air Force plans to have an operational weapon by 2026.

Criticism 
 During Operation Allied Force, NATO reportedly fired 743 HARMs during the course of the 78-day campaign, but could confirm the destruction of only 3 of the original 25 SA-6 batteries. Over half of the HARM's expended were preemptive targeting shots (PET), fired at suspected SAM sites, but without a radar to target. During the campaign, Serbian SAMs fired more than 800 SAMs with only 2 NATO aircraft downed, the majority from fixed sites were fired without radar guidance. Radars were also forced to operate for only 20 seconds or less to avoid destruction by HARMs. According to Lambeth, the F-117 that was downed did not have SEAD support from HARM-carrying F-16CJ aircraft.

Operators

Current operators

 : AGM-88E variant ordered; to be used on EA-18G Growlers. On 28 April 2017, the Defense Security Cooperation Agency stated that Australia intended to purchase 70 AGM-88B and 40 AGM-88E missiles.
 
 
 : AGM-88B Block IIIA and AGM-88E variants. AGM-88E AARGM on order.
 
 : AGM-88E variant.
 
 : AGM-88B/C/E variant.
 
 
 
 : AGM-88B
 
 
 
 :
 United States Air Force
 United States Marine Corps
 United States Navy

See also

 AGM-122 Sidearm
 AGM-78 Standard ARM
 AGM-45 Shrike
 ALARM
 ARMAT
 Kh-28
 Kh-31
 Kh-58
 LD-10
 MAR-1
 Martel
 Rudram-1
 YJ-91

References
 Notes

 Bibliography

External links 

 AGM-88 data sheet (PDF format) from Raytheon
 Information on AGM-88 HARM from FAS
 AGM-88 HARM information by Globalsecurity.org
 AGM-88 at Designation-Systems
 AGM-88 HARM by Carlo Kopp

AGM-088
Alliant Techsystems
Anti-radiation missiles of the Cold War
AGM-088
Raytheon Company products
Texas Instruments
Military equipment introduced in the 1980s